Kalashtar (also Romanized as Kaleshtar, Keleshtar, and Kolashtar; also known as Kalishtar) is a village in Kalashtar Rural District, in the Central District of Rudbar County, Gilan Province, Iran. At the 2006 census, its population was 1,272, in 409 families.

References 

Populated places in Rudbar County